Cheltenham Spa Malvern Road railway station was a station in the town of Cheltenham.

History

The station was opened by the Great Western Railway on 30 March 1908, as Cheltenham Malvern Road. The station took its name from the road to the north from which a long driveway provided the main means of public access. The platform served both main running lines, together with a bay at the north end into which local branch railmotor services to and from  reversed before returning to the St. James terminus, which was much closer to Cheltenham town centre. Stone from the Cleeve Hill quarries was used in the station buildings, while the platform copings were sourced from Pontypridd.

Regular through services from Birmingham Snow Hill to the West of England via Stratford and Malvern Road commenced on 1 July 1908 upon the opening of the North Warwickshire Line. By April 1910, The Cornishman express was calling at Malvern Road as part of its Wolverhampton to  service. The suspension of long-distance services for a period towards the end of the First World War led to the temporary closure of Malvern Road as an economy measure between 1 January 1917 and 7 July 1919. Not long after reopening, the station was renamed Cheltenham Spa Malvern Road on 1 February 1925.

To the west of Malvern Road lay several loop sidings serving a two-road engine shed and coaling stage. Access to these facilities was controlled by two signal boxes - Malvern Road East to the north, and Malvern Road West to the south. The East box was opened on 15 July 1906 and had 49 levers; it had replaced the Bayshill signal box which had controlled access to a locomotive shed demolished when the line was extended to Honeybourne. The West box was open by June 1908 and had 37 levers; it replaced a temporary box dating from August 1906. The station saw very little goods traffic as most were handled at St. James; a 15-ton weighbridge was nevertheless provided in the yard.

High-speed services between Bristol Temple Meads and Birmingham on the Birmingham to Gloucester line led to a decline in traffic on the Honeybourne line which closed to local passenger services from 7 March 1960. Malvern Road closed on 3 January 1966 to goods and passengers. The Cheltenham to Honeybourne stretch remained open for passenger trains until 1968 and occasional freight traffic until 25 August 1976 when the derailment of a coal train at  caused damage to the Down line which was considered uneconomic to repair. Malvern Road West Signal Box had closed on 5 June 1966, with the East Signal Box lasting until 3 November 1970.

Present day

, the site is now a housing estate of some 100 homes. A long-term goal of the Gloucestershire Warwickshire Railway is to extend their services towards the present station at Cheltenham Spa (Lansdown) (with the intention of offering interchange with rail services on the Cross Country Route), which would involve passing the site of Malvern Road.

Route

Notes

References

Further reading

Disused railway stations in Gloucestershire
Former Great Western Railway stations
Railway stations in Great Britain opened in 1908
Railway stations in Great Britain closed in 1917
Railway stations in Great Britain opened in 1919
Railway stations in Great Britain closed in 1966
Transport in Cheltenham
Beeching closures in England
1908 establishments in England